The Royal African Rifles  is a 1953 American Cinecolor First World War adventure film directed by Lesley Selander and starring Louis Hayward, Veronica Hurst and Michael Pate. It is set in British East Africa but filmed on location in the Los Angeles County Arboretum and Botanic Garden.  The film was the first production of Louis Hayward's production company Associated Film Artists, but Hayward's company made no other films. It was distributed by Allied Artists. The working title was The Queen’s African Rifles. In reality, there was never a military unit called “The Royal African Rifles”, although the King's African Rifles served in Africa during the war. The film was retitled Storm Over Africa in the United Kingdom.

Plot
In August 1914, a consignment of Vickers machine guns are stolen off a Royal Navy ship, HMS Marlin. An RN Lieutenant aboard the ship goes undercover as a white hunter through British East Africa to find the weapons before they get into the hands of the Germans and alter the balance of power in Africa.

Cast
Louis Hayward as Lt. James Denham RN 
Veronica Hurst as Jennifer Cunningham 
Michael Pate as Bill Cunningham
Steven Geray as Franz Van Stede
Angela Greene as Karen Van Stede
 Bruce Lester as Saxon
 Barry Bernard as 	Eakins
 Robert Osterloh as Carney
Roy Glenn as Cpl. John
 John Warburton as Col. Burke
 Patrick Aherne as 	Capt. Curtis
Juanita Moore as Elderly Woman
 Woody Strode as Soldier

References

External links

1953 films
1953 adventure films
1950s English-language films
Films directed by Lesley Selander
Films set in Kenya
American World War I films
World War I films set in Africa
Allied Artists films
Cinecolor films
Films scored by Paul Dunlap
American adventure films
1950s American films